Manda may be:
Manda language (Australia)
Manda language (India)
Manda language (Tanzania)
the Manda dialect of the Venda language